Allonyx is a genus of beetles in the subfamily Clerinae.

References 

 

Clerinae
Cleridae genera